Churchill Island is a island in Western Port, Victoria, Australia.

Churchill Island or Churchill's Island may also refer to:

 Churchill Island Marine National Park, Victoria, Australia
 Churchill, Prince Edward Island, Canada
 Churchill's Island, a 1941 propaganda film
 An island in the Aroostook River near Crouseville, Maine